Commandant Birot (F796) is a  in the French Navy.

Design 

Armed by a crew of 90 sailors, these vessels have the reputation of being among the most difficult in bad weather. Their high windage makes them particularly sensitive to pitch and roll as soon as the sea is formed.

Their armament, consequent for a vessel of this tonnage, allows them to manage a large spectrum of missions. During the Cold War, they were primarily used to patrol the continental shelf of the Atlantic Ocean in search of Soviet Navy submarines. Due to the poor performance of the hull sonar, as soon as an echo appeared, the reinforcement of an ASM frigate was necessary to chase it using its towed variable depth sonar.

Their role as patrollers now consists mainly of patrols and assistance missions, as well as participation in UN missions (blockades, flag checks) or similar marine policing tasks (fight against drugs, extraction of nationals, fisheries control, etc.). The mer-mer 38 or mer-mer 40 missiles have been landed, but they carry several machine guns and machine guns, more suited to their new missions.

Its construction cost was estimated at 270,000,000 French francs.

Construction and career 
Commandant Ducuing was laid down on 23 March 1981 at Arsenal de Lorient, Lorient. Launched on 22 May 1982 and commissioned on 14 March 1984.

On 13 January 2014, the ship was cited to the order of the division for having distinguished himself in the conduct and successful boarding of the Luna S, a vessel filled with cannabis arrested off the coast of Algeria. September 8 to 13, 2013.

In May 2015, she participated in Operation Triton. She collects 217 castaways on May 2. She saved 297 migrants on May 20, 2015.

On May 23, 2019, she participated, with the patroller Jean-François Deniau, in the seizure of 7.4 tonnes of cannabis as part of a joint operation between the Customs and the Navy off the coast of France. In November / December 2019, it patrols the Black Sea and carries out military diplomacy and intelligence missions.

In 2022, it was indicated that the ship would be equipped with the SMDM (navy mini-drone system) to enhance her surveillance capabilities. 

She is scheduled to be withdrawn from service in 2025 and be replaced by one of a new class of ocean-going Patrol Vessels (the Patrouilleurs Océanique).

Citations 

Ships built in Lorient
1982 ships
D'Estienne d'Orves-class avisos